Shipai is a town under the jurisdiction of the prefecture-level city of Dongguan in Guangdong province, China.

External links

Geography of Dongguan
Towns in Guangdong